Sabino Bellomo (born 1 January 1964) is an Italian lightweight rower. He won a gold medal at the 1988 World Rowing Championships in Milan with the lightweight men's eight.

References

1964 births
Living people
Italian male rowers
World Rowing Championships medalists for Italy